"Take Me Over" is a song by Australian electronic music duo Peking Duk. The song features vocals from SAFIA. It was produced by Adam Hyde and Reuben Styles of Peking Duk. The song was released on 10 October 2014 by Vicious Recordings as the second single from the duo’s debut EP, Songs to Sweat To.

"Take Me Over" reached a peak of number 32 on the New Zealand charts and number 6 on the Australian ARIA Charts, where the song also received a certification of 2× Platinum. The song placed at number 5 on the Triple J Hottest 100, 2014.

Music video
A music video to accompany the release of "Take Me Over" was first released on YouTube on 19 November 2014 at a total length of four minutes and one second. The video was directed by Frank Meets Wolf (Jeff Johnson and Max Miller). The video follows a young imaginative boy (William Franklyn-Miller) whose parents are in the middle of a fight. During the fight, the boy imagines he is an astronaut on a beach who meets a girl (Meika Woollard), before they play/explore together and escape from an attack by a masked villain. The boy's mother, a smoker, then takes the boy away from his home. The boy then imagines he is a knight who leads an army of grown-up knights to fight against another group of knights who have the girl captive. The boy rescues the girl and the two are confronted by a knight, the father, who is defeated by the two children. The video ends with the mother and the boy at the park, where the boy sees the girl arrive at the park, indicating that the two become friends. The video received universal acclaim from viewers.

Reviews
Paul McBride from theaureview said; "Peking Duk have dropped another killer electro jam. Expect 'Take Me Over' to get many thousands of arms up in the air over the summer festival season."

RJ Frometa from Vents Magazine said; "'Take Me Over' captivat[es] listeners from the opening beat. Adam and Reuben have created a harmonious balance between indie and electronica, perfectly complimenting Woolner-Kirkham's blissful and highly-emotive vocals to create an uplifting and sophisticated soundscape that proves when it comes to production, these guys truly are at the top of their game."

Remixes
A remix single was released on 19 December 2014.
 "Take Me Over" (Just A Gent remix) – 4:59
 "Take Me Over" (NEUS remix) – 3:55
 "Take Me Over" (Sonny Fodera remix) – 6:09

Charts

Weekly charts

Year-end charts

Certifications

References

APRA Award winners
Peking Duk songs
Safia (band) songs
2014 singles
2014 songs